In mathematics, especially in category theory and homotopy theory, a groupoid (less often Brandt groupoid or virtual group) generalises the notion of group in several equivalent ways. A groupoid can be seen as a:
Group with a partial function replacing the binary operation;
Category in which every morphism is invertible. A category of this sort can be viewed as augmented with a unary operation on the morphisms, called inverse by analogy with group theory. A groupoid where there is only one object is a usual group.

In the presence of dependent typing, a category in general can be viewed as a typed monoid, and similarly, a groupoid can be viewed as simply a typed group. Composition is then a total function: , so that .

Special cases include:
Setoids: sets that come with an equivalence relation,
G-sets: sets equipped with an action of a group .

Groupoids are often used to reason about geometrical objects such as manifolds.  introduced groupoids implicitly via Brandt semigroups.

Definitions 

Algebraic 

A groupoid is a set  with a unary operation  and a partial function  .

(The previous two axioms already show that these expressions are defined and unambiguous.)

Two easy and convenient properties follow from these axioms:
 ,
 If  is defined, then .

Category theoretic
A groupoid is a small category in which every morphism is an isomorphism, i.e., invertible. More explicitly, a groupoid G is:
 A set G0 of objects;
 For each pair of objects x and y in G0, there exists a (possibly empty) set G(x,y) of morphisms (or arrows) from x to y. We write f : x → y to indicate that f is an element of G(x,y).
 For every object x, a designated element  of G(x,x);
 For each triple of objects x, y, and z, a function ;
 For each pair of objects x, y a function ;

satisfying, for any f : x → y, g : y → z, and h : z → w:
 ;

If f is an element of G(x,y) then x is called the source of f, written s(f), and y is called the target of f, written t(f).

More generally, one can consider a groupoid object in an arbitrary category admitting finite fiber products.

Comparing the definitions
The algebraic and category-theoretic definitions are equivalent, as we now show. Given a groupoid in the category-theoretic sense, let G be the disjoint union of all of the sets G(x,y) (i.e. the sets of morphisms from x to y). Then  and  become partial operations on G, and  will in fact be defined everywhere. We define ∗ to be  and −1 to be , which gives a groupoid in the algebraic sense. Explicit reference to G0 (and hence to ) can be dropped.

Conversely, given a groupoid G in the algebraic sense, define an equivalence relation  on its elements by
 iff a ∗ a−1 = b ∗ b−1.

Now define  as the set of all elements f such that  exists. To see that this is well defined, observe that since  and  exist, so does . The identity morphism on x is then , and the category-theoretic inverse of f is f−1.

Sets in the definitions above may be replaced with classes, as is generally the case in category theory.

Vertex groups and orbits
Given a groupoid G, the vertex groups or isotropy groups or object groups in G are the subsets of the form G(x,x), where x is any object of G. It follows easily from the axioms above that these are indeed groups, as every pair of elements is composable and inverses are in the same vertex group.

Orbits form a partition of the set X, and a groupoid is called transitive if it has only one orbit (equivalently, if it is connected as a category). In that case, all the vertex groups are isomorphic (on the other hand, this is not a sufficient condition for transitivity; see the section below for counterexamples).

Subgroupoids and morphisms

A groupoid morphism is simply a functor between two (category-theoretic) groupoids.

Particular kinds of morphisms of groupoids are of interest. The covering morphisms of groupoids are especially useful because they can be used to model covering maps of spaces.

It is also true that the category of covering morphisms of a given groupoid  is equivalent to the category of actions of the groupoid  on sets.

Examples

Topology

Given a topological space , let  be the set .
Two such morphisms are composed by first following the first path, then the second; the homotopy equivalence guarantees that this composition is associative. The usual fundamental group  is then the vertex group for the point .

Accordingly, the fundamental groupoid of a path-connected space is transitive, and we recover the known fact that the fundamental groups at any base point are isomorphic. Moreover, in this case, the fundamental groupoid and the fundamental groups are equivalent as categories (see the section below for the general theory).

An important extension of this idea is to consider the fundamental groupoid  where  is a chosen set of "base points". The set  may be chosen according to the geometry of the situation at hand.

Equivalence relation
If  is a setoid, i.e. a set with an equivalence relation , then a groupoid "representing" this equivalence relation can be formed as follows:
The vertex groups of this groupoid are always trivial; moreover, this groupoid is in general not transitive and its orbits are precisely the equivalence classes. There are two extreme examples:

Examples 
If  is a smooth surjective submersion of smooth manifolds, then  is an equivalence relation since  has a topology isomorphic to the quotient topology of  under the surjective map of topological spaces. If we write,  then we get a groupoidwhich is sometimes called the banal groupoid of a surjective submersion of smooth manifolds.
If we relax the reflexivity requirement and consider partial equivalence relations, then it becomes possible to consider semidecidable notions of equivalence on computable realisers for sets. This allows groupoids to be used as a computable approximation to set theory, called PER models. Considered as a category, PER models are a cartesian closed category with natural numbers object and subobject classifier, giving rise to the effective topos introduced by Martin Hyland.

Čech groupoid 

A Čech groupoidpg 5 is a special kind of groupoid associated to an equivalence relation given by an open cover  of some manifold . It's objects are given by the disjoint unionand its arrows are the intersectionsThe source and target maps are then given by the induced mapsand the inclusion mapgiving the structure of a groupoid. In fact, this can be further extended by settingas the -iterated fiber product where the  represents -tuples of composable arrows. This construction can be seen as a model for some ∞-groupoids. Also, another artifact of this construction is k-cocyclesfor some constant sheaf of abelian groups can be represented as a functiongiving an explicit representation of cohomology classes.

Group action
If the group  acts on the set , then we can form the action groupoid (or transformation groupoid) representing this group action as follows:

Multiplication (or composition) in the groupoid is then  which is defined provided .

Similarly, the orbits of the action groupoid are the orbit of the group action, and the groupoid is transitive if and only if the group action is transitive.

Another way to describe -sets is the functor category , where  is the groupoid (category) with one element and isomorphic to the group . The categorical structure of the functor  assures us that  defines a -action on the set .

Finite set

Quotient variety 
Any finite group  which maps to  give a group action on the affine space  (since this is the group of automorphisms). Then, a quotient groupoid can be of the forms , which has one point with stabilizer  at the origin. Examples like these form the basis for the theory of orbifolds. Another commonly studied family of orbifolds are weighted projective spaces  and subspaces of them, such as Calabi-Yau orbifolds.

Fiber product of groupoids
Given a diagram of groupoids with groupoid morphisms

Homological algebra
A two term complex

of objects in a concrete Abelian category can be used to form a groupoid. That is, given , we have

Of course, if the abelian category is the category of coherent sheaves on a scheme, then this construction can be used to form a presheaf of groupoids.

Puzzles 

While puzzles such as the Rubik's Cube can be modeled using group theory (see Rubik's Cube group), certain puzzles are better modeled as groupoids.

The transformations of the fifteen puzzle form a groupoid (not a group, as not all moves can be composed). This groupoid acts on configurations.

Mathieu groupoid

The Mathieu groupoid is a groupoid introduced by John Horton Conway acting on 13 points such that the elements fixing a point form a copy of the Mathieu group M12.

Relation to groups 

If a groupoid has only one object, then the set of its morphisms forms a group. Using the algebraic definition, such a groupoid is literally just a group. Many concepts of group theory generalize to groupoids, with the notion of functor replacing that of group homomorphism.

Every transitive/connected groupoid - that is, as explained above, one in which any two objects are connected by at least one morphism - is isomorphic to an action groupoid (as defined above) . By transitivity, there will only be one orbit under the action.

Note that the isomorphism just mentioned is not unique, and there is no natural choice.

If a groupoid is not transitive, then it is isomorphic to a disjoint union of groupoids of the above type, also called its connected components (possibly with different groups  and sets  for each connected component).

In category-theoretic terms, each connected component of a groupoid is equivalent (but not isomorphic) to a groupoid with a single object, that is, a single group. Thus any groupoid is equivalent to a multiset of unrelated groups. In other words, for equivalence instead of isomorphism, one does not need to specify the sets , but only the groups  For example,

The set  with the equivalence relation  is equivalent (as a groupoid) to one copy of the trivial group for each equivalence class, but an isomorphism requires specifying what each equivalence class is:

The collapse of a groupoid into a mere collection of groups loses some information, even from a category-theoretic point of view, because it is not natural. Thus when groupoids arise in terms of other structures, as in the above examples, it can be helpful to maintain the entire groupoid. Otherwise, one must choose a way to view each  in terms of a single group, and this choice can be arbitrary. In the example from topology, one would have to make a coherent choice of paths (or equivalence classes of paths) from each point  to each point  in the same path-connected component.

As a more illuminating example, the classification of groupoids with one endomorphism does not reduce to purely group theoretic considerations. This is analogous to the fact that the classification of vector spaces with one endomorphism is nontrivial.

Morphisms of groupoids come in more kinds than those of groups: we have, for example, fibrations, covering morphisms, universal morphisms, and quotient morphisms. In this way, presentations of the group  can be "lifted" to presentations of the groupoid , and this is a useful way of obtaining information about presentations of the subgroup . For further information, see the books by Higgins and by Brown in the References.

Category of groupoids 
The category whose objects are groupoids and whose morphisms are groupoid morphisms is called the groupoid category, or the category of groupoids, and is denoted by Grpd.

The category Grpd is, like the category of small categories, Cartesian closed: for any groupoids  we can construct a groupoid  whose objects are the morphisms  and whose arrows are the natural equivalences of morphisms. Thus if  are just groups, then such arrows are the conjugacies of morphisms. The main result is that for any groupoids  there is a natural bijection

This result is of interest even if all the groupoids  are just groups.

Another important property of Grpd is that it is both complete and cocomplete.

Relation to Cat 

The inclusion  has both a left and a right adjoint:

Here,  denotes the localization of a category that inverts every morphism, and  denotes the subcategory of all isomorphisms.

Relation to sSet 

The nerve functor  embeds Grpd as a full subcategory of the category of simplicial sets. The nerve of a groupoid is always a Kan complex.

The nerve has a left adjoint

Here,  denotes the fundamental groupoid of the simplicial set X.

Groupoids in Grpd 

There is an additional structure which can be derived from groupoids internal to the category of groupoids, double-groupoids. Because Grpd is a 2-category, these objects form a 2-category instead of a 1-category since there is extra structure. Essentially, these are groupoids  with functorsand an embedding given by an identity functorOne way to think about these 2-groupoids is they contain objects, morphisms, and squares which can compose together vertically and horizontally. For example, given squares and with  the same morphism, they can be vertically conjoined giving a diagramwhich can be converted into another square by composing the vertical arrows. There is a similar composition law for horizontal attachments of squares.

Groupoids with geometric structures 

When studying geometrical objects, the arising groupoids often carry a topology, turning them into topological groupoids, or even some differentiable structure, turning them into Lie groupoids. These last objects can be also studied in terms of their associated Lie algebroids, in analogy to the relation between Lie groups and Lie algebras.

Groupoids arising from geometry often possess further structures which interact with the groupoid multiplication. For instance, in Poisson geometry one has the notion of a symplectic groupoid, which is a Lie groupoid endowed with a compatible symplectic form. Similarly, one can have groupoids with a compatible Riemannian metric, or complex structure, etc.

See also 
∞-groupoid
2-group
Homotopy type theory
Inverse category
Groupoid algebra (not to be confused with algebraic groupoid)
R-algebroid

Notes

References

Brown, Ronald, 1987, "From groups to groupoids: a brief survey," Bull. London Math. Soc. 19: 113-34. Reviews the history of groupoids up to 1987, starting with the work of Brandt on quadratic forms. The downloadable version updates the many references.
 —, 2006. Topology and groupoids. Booksurge. Revised and extended edition of a book previously published in 1968 and 1988. Groupoids are introduced in the context of their topological application.
 —, Higher dimensional group theory  Explains how the groupoid concept has led to higher-dimensional homotopy groupoids, having applications in homotopy theory and in group cohomology. Many references.
 
 
F. Borceux, G. Janelidze, 2001, Galois theories. Cambridge Univ. Press. Shows how generalisations of Galois theory lead to Galois groupoids.
 Cannas da Silva, A., and A. Weinstein, Geometric Models for Noncommutative Algebras. Especially Part VI.
Golubitsky, M., Ian Stewart, 2006, "Nonlinear dynamics of networks: the groupoid formalism", Bull. Amer. Math. Soc. 43: 305-64
 
 Higgins, P. J., "The fundamental groupoid of a graph of groups", J. London Math. Soc. (2) 13 (1976) 145—149.
 Higgins, P. J. and Taylor, J., "The fundamental groupoid and the homotopy crossed complex of   an orbit space",  in Category theory (Gummersbach, 1981), Lecture Notes   in Math., Volume 962. Springer, Berlin (1982), 115—122.
Higgins, P. J., 1971.  Categories and groupoids. Van Nostrand Notes in Mathematics. Republished in Reprints in Theory and Applications of Categories, No. 7 (2005) pp. 1–195; freely downloadable. Substantial introduction to category theory with special emphasis on groupoids. Presents applications of groupoids in group theory, for example to a generalisation of Grushko's theorem, and in topology, e.g. fundamental groupoid.
Mackenzie, K. C. H., 2005. General theory of Lie groupoids and Lie algebroids. Cambridge Univ. Press.
Weinstein, Alan, "Groupoids: unifying internal and external symmetry — A tour through some examples." Also available in Postscript., Notices of the AMS, July 1996, pp. 744–752.
 Weinstein, Alan, "The Geometry of Momentum" (2002)
 R.T. Zivaljevic. "Groupoids in combinatorics—applications of a theory of local symmetries". In Algebraic and geometric combinatorics, volume 423 of  Contemp. Math., 305–324.  Amer. Math. Soc., Providence, RI (2006)
 
 

Algebraic structures
Category theory
Homotopy theory